Brad Marshall (born April 11, 1967) is an American actor.

Marshall was born in Nairobi, Kenya to Brad Marshall and Sandy Marshall. He has three brothers: Ryan, Neil, and Eric. He lives in Knoxville, Tennessee, United States.

Filmography
 1993 Civil War Journal as Col. Strong Vincent
 1996 The New Detectives: Case Studies in Forensic Science as Stephen Vance Taylor
 1998 The FBI Files as Detective van Claussen
 2002 One Last Cigarette as Vlad
 2002 American's Most Wanted as James Detmer
 2002 Eating and Weeping as President
 2002 North of Dupont as Congressman Sonny Fenwick
 2002 Dr. Jekyll and Mr. Hyde as Dr. Humbolt
 2003 Head of State as Demolition man
 2003 Smithee's Lecture as Professor Englot
 2003 Operation Neighborhood Freedom as Dave Simpson
 2006 Teen Wolff 3: The Return of the Wolf as Bear #3
 2006 Cops as Malloy

External links

 
 Official website

1967 births
American male film actors
American male television actors
Kenyan emigrants to the United States
Living people